Zeit Wissen is a bi-monthly popular science magazine published in Germany. The magazine is spun off from the German weekly newspaper Die Zeit. The German phrase "Zeit Wissen" literally translates to "Time-Knowledge," and refers to the up-to-the-minute nature of the magazine's subject matter and focus.

History
Zeit Wissen was launched in 2004. The magazine is published by Zeitverlag Gerd Bucerius. The first editor-in-chief of the magazine was Christoph Drösser. The editor-in-chief of the magazine is Andreas Lebert who was appointed to the post in August 2013, replacing Jan Schweitzer.

The magazine frequently is compared to the American publication Wired, in that it covers the "cutting edge" of such diverse topics as technology, science, history, fashion, modern lifestyles, avant-garde art, photography, health, and even food. In February 2012 Zeit Wissen started its news section, Environment and Society.

Zeit Wissen offers annually encouraging sustainability award.

The 2007 circulation of Zeit Wissen was 71,297 copies. The circulation of the bi-monthly was 89,023 for the second part of 2012.

See also
 List of magazines in Germany

References

External links
 Zeit Wissen website (German)

2004 establishments in Germany
Bi-monthly magazines published in Germany
German-language magazines
Magazines established in 2004
Magazines published in Hamburg
Popular science magazines